Herschel Clinton "Bill" Prough (November 28, 1887 – December 29, 1937), was a professional baseball player.  Prough was a right-handed pitcher, pitching in the Major Leagues for one season, 1912 with the Cincinnati Reds. Prough had an extended and successful minor league career, pitching for 17 seasons and compiling over 4600 innings pitched.

Prough was born in Markle, Indiana and died in Richmond, Indiana.

External links

1887 births
1937 deaths
Cincinnati Reds players
Major League Baseball pitchers
Baseball players from Indiana
Keokuk Indians players
Birmingham Barons players
Oakland Oaks (baseball) players
Sacramento Senators players
Shreveport Sports players